Gordon Paul John Connelly (born 1 November 1976) is a Scottish professional footballer, who played as a forward for several teams in the Football League.

References

External links

1976 births
Living people
Footballers from Glasgow
Scottish footballers
Association football forwards
Airdrieonians F.C. (1878) players
York City F.C. players
Southend United F.C. players
Carlisle United F.C. players
Queen of the South F.C. players
Berwick Rangers F.C. players
Stenhousemuir F.C. players
English Football League players
Scottish Football League players
Scotland youth international footballers